Wapakoneta may refer to:

Places
Wapakoneta, Ohio
The Lima-Van Wert-Wapakoneta, Ohio Combined Statistical Area

Ships
, United States Navy ships

Other
The Treaty of Wapakoneta
The Wapakoneta City School District of Wapakoneta, Ohio